Under the Volcano is the only studio album by the English rock group The Family Rain, released on 31 January 2014 through Virgin EMI Records. It was produced by Jim Abbiss and recorded over four weeks at Hansa Studios in Berlin. The release was preceded by the singles "Trust Me I'm A Genius", "Carnival", "Reason to Die", "Feel Better (FRANK)" and the EP "Pushing It".

Track listing

References

2014 albums
The Family Rain albums